Ordinary World may refer to:

Music 
 Ordinary World (album), by Get Set Go

Songs 
 "Ordinary World" (song), by Duran Duran, from the album Duran Duran (The Wedding Album), covered by Joy Williams, Red, Aurora, and other artists
 "Ordinary World", by Green Day, from the album Revolution Radio

Other uses 
 Ordinary World (novel), 1986
 Ordinary World (film), 2016